Warnakulasuriya Tharindu Nimantha Fernando (born 1 May 1987) is an Italian cricketer of Sri Lankan origin. He made his debut for the Italian national side at the 2013 European T20 Championship.

A right-handed batsman bowling occasional medium pace, Fernando played only a single match in his debut tournament, making a four-ball duck against Guernsey. By winning the European T20 Championship, Italy qualified for the 2013 World Twenty20 Qualifier, where matches had full Twenty20 status. Although he featured in both of Italy's warm-up games (against Bermuda and the Netherlands), in the full tournament Fernando played only in the last game of the competition, the ninth-place playoff against Namibia. In his only full Twenty20 match to date, he scored two runs before being run out by Craig Williams, and did not bowl. Fernando played his first full tournament for Italy in June 2014, playing all six matches at the 2014 WCL Division Four tournament in Singapore. His best performance there came in the match against Malaysia, where he scored 43 from 62 balls coming in seventh in the batting order, featuring in an 82-run sixth-wicket stand with Alessandro Bonora.

Fernando has been included in Italy's squad for its next major tournament, the 2015 European T20 Championship in Jersey.

References

External links
Player profile and statistics at Cricket Archive
Player profile and statistics at ESPNcricinfo

1987 births
Living people
Italian cricketers
Sri Lankan cricketers
Sri Lankan emigrants to Italy
People from Chilaw